Joseph Addo (born November 2, 1990, in Ghana) is a Ghanaian footballer currently playing for Ghanaian club Aduana Stars in the Glo Premier, as a goalkeeper.

Career
Addo began his career on youth team of Sekondi Hasaacas F.C. and was promoted to the club's senior Glo Premier League team in January 2006. After his return from the 2009 FIFA U-20 World Cup he became the starting goalie for his club Sekondi Hasaacas. Addo left the club following its relegation to the Poly Tank Division One League and from the 2010–11 Glo Premier League season and joined Glo Premier League club and joined Heart of Lions in start for the 2011–12 Glo Premier League season.

International career
Addo was member for Ghana national under-17 football team in 2007 FIFA U-17 World Cup in South Korea and played 7 games. He was the first choice goalkeeper for the under 17 tournament in Korea 2007 where Ghana placed third in the championship. On 19 August 2008 was called for the Satellites and with the team  won the 2009 FIFA U-20 World Cup in Egypt where he was taken the second choice goalkeeper.

He was called up to the senior Ghana squad for a World Cup qualifier against Egypt in October 2017.

Titles and honours

International
Ghana U-20
 FIFA U-20 World Cup Champion: 2009

References

External links 
 FIFA Profile

1990 births
Living people
Ghanaian footballers
Ghana under-20 international footballers
Association football goalkeepers
King Faisal Babes FC players
Sekondi Hasaacas F.C. players
African Games gold medalists for Ghana
African Games medalists in football
Aduana Stars F.C. players
Competitors at the 2011 All-Africa Games